Alfred is an unincorporated hamlet in LaMoure County, North Dakota, United States.  It was one of five towns founded by Richard Sykes. Its population is estimated at about 10 and it consists of a few houses, a licensed boarding home, a grocery store and a Protestant church, as well as grain storage bins and a boat-dock at the small lake which borders the hamlet on the northeast.  Alfred is surrounded by numerous grain farms.  There are no local town services, and its post office has closed. But the mayor, Alex Williams, was overwhelmingly elected in 2013 by the citizens.

References
Manta.com
Ghosttowns.com entry

External links

Unincorporated communities in LaMoure County, North Dakota
Unincorporated communities in North Dakota